My First Album is the debut album by Lolly, released in 1999. It featured the hit "Viva La Radio" and reached number 21 on the UK Albums Chart.

Track listing
All songs written by the Dufflebag Boys (Mike Rose and Nick Foster) except as indicated.

 Viva la Radio 2:44
 Mickey (Mike Chapman, Nicky Chinn) 3:36
 Big Boys Don't Cry 3:23
 Kiss Kiss Boom Boom 3:01
 Dance in the Rain 3:01
 Can You Keep a Secret? 2:50
 Internet Love 2:57
 Happy 2:52
 Telephone Boy 2:10
 Do You Feel Like I Feel? 2:52
 Viva La Radio (Karaoke Version) 2:44
 Mickey (Karaoke Version) (Chapman, Chinn) 3:36
 Big Boys Don't Cry (Karaoke Version) 3:23
 Kiss Kiss Boom Boom (Karaoke Version) 3:01
 Dance in the Rain (Karaoke Version) 3:01
 Can You Keep a Secret? (Karaoke Version) 2:50
 Internet Love (Karaoke Version) 2:57
 Happy (Karaoke Version) 2:52
 Telephone Boy (Karaoke Version) 2:10
 Do You Feel Like I Feel? (Karaoke Version) 2:52

Charts

Certifications

References

1999 debut albums
Polydor Records albums
Lolly (singer) albums